The Legend of Nazaré has it that on the early morning of September 14, 1182, Dom Fuas Roupinho, alcalde of Porto de Mós, Portugal, was out hunting on his domain near the coast, when he saw and immediately began chasing a deer. All of a sudden a heavy fog rose up from the sea. The deer ran towards the top of a cliff, and in the fog Dom Fuas was cut off from his companions. When he realised he was at the edge of the cliff, he recognised the place. He was next to a small grotto where a statue of Our Lady with the Infant was venerated. He prayed out loud "Our Lady, help me." The horse miraculously stopped at the end of a rocky point suspended over the void, the Bico do Milagre (Point of the Miracle), saving the rider and his mount from a drop of more than 100 metres, which would certainly have caused their death.

Dom Fuas dismounted and went down to the grotto to pray and give thanks for the miracle. Then he ordered his companions to fetch masons in order to build a small chapel over the grotto, so that the miraculous statue could be easily venerated by all as a memorial to the miracle that saved him. Before walling up the grotto, the masons destroyed the existing altar where among the stones they found an ivory chest containing some relics and an old parchment describing the story of the little wooden statue, one palm high, of Our Lady seated breastfeeding baby Jesus seated on her left leg.

According to the parchment the statue must have been venerated since the beginning of Christianity in Nazareth, in Palestine. It was rescued from the iconoclasts in the fifth century by the monk Ciriaco. He brought it to Iberia, to the monastery of Cauliniana near Mérida. It remained there until 711, the year of the battle of Guadalete, when the Christian forces were defeated by the invading Moorish army coming from North Africa.

When the news of the defeat arrived at Mérida, the friars of Cauliniana prepared to leave their monastery. Meanwhile, the defeated king, Roderic, who was able to flee the battlefield alone and disguised as a beggar, anonymously asked for shelter at the monastery. When he asked one of the friars, Frei Romano, to hear him in Confession he had to tell him who he really was. Then the friar suggested they flee together, taking with them an old and holy image of Mary with the Infant venerated at the monastery.

So the statue of Our Lady of Nazaré, which received its name from the village in the Holy Land where it was first venerated, was brought by friar Romano and by king Roderic to the Atlantic coast. When they reached their destination they settled in an empty hermitage on the top of a rocky hill, the Monte de S. Bartolomeu, and there they stayed for a few days. They then decided to separate and live by themselves as hermits. The friar took the image and settled in a little grotto on the edge of a cliff above the sea, next to the hill where the king went on living.

A year went by and Roderic decided to leave the region. Friar Romano stayed in his hermitage above the sea until he died. The holy statue, a black Madonna, stayed on the altar where he left it until 1182, when Dom Fuas, after the miracle, moved it to the chapel built over the grotto as a memorial to the event that saved his life. Thus the still existing chapel was named Capela da Memória (Chapel of the Memory).

In 1377, because of the increased number of pilgrims, king Fernando had a church built near the chapel and transferred the statue there. At the end of the sixteenth century, this church experienced the first of a series of reconstructions and enlargements. The existing building is now the result of several interventions from the sixteenth to the nineteenth centuries that give it a very unusual character. This church or sanctuary is named Santuário de Nossa Senhora da Nazaré (Sanctuary of Our Lady of Nazaré). The holy image is now on display in the main chapel in a small niche above the altar that can be accessed by a staircase leading from the sacristy.  Since 711, the statue has remained in the village named after it: Sítio da Nazaré (Place of the Nazaré). In this village, nowadays, a quarter of the town of Nazaré, one can still visit the three sanctuaries mentioned above: the underground hermitage, the small chapel above it, and the church where one can visit Our Lady of Nazaré.

According to oral tradition, the holy icon was sculpted by Joseph the carpenter, in Nazareth, when Jesus was still a baby. A few decades latter Luke the Evangelist painted it. This would make it the most ancient image venerated by Christians.

See also 
 Memory Hermitage of Nazaré

Notes

References 
 Brito, Frei Bernardo de, Monarquia Lusitana, Tomo II pags 272-283, Lisboa, 1609
 Alão, Manoel de Brito, Antiguidade da Sagrada Imagem de Nossa S. de Nazareth, Lisboa, 1628
 Costa, Padre António Carvalho da, Corografia Portuguesa, Lisboa, 1712
 Boga, Padre Mendes, Nossa Senhora da Nazaré, Porto, 1ª ed. 1929
 Begg, Ean, The cult of the Black Virgin, England, 1985
 Granada, João António Godinho, Nazaré, Nossa Senhora e D. Fuas Roupinho, Batalha, 1998
 Penteado, Pedro, coord., Santuário da Senhora da Nazaré, Lisboa, 2002
 Monteiro, João Filipe Oliva, Nossa Senhora da Nazaré, Nazaré, 2012

Portuguese legends
N
Nazaré, Portugal